Ambika Pillai is a hair stylist and make-up artist from Kollam, Kerala, India. Her work regularly appears in advertising campaigns, catwalk shows, fashion films, and editorials.

Personal life
Ambika Pillai was born to a cashew exporter Gopinath Pillai & Santha Gopinath Pillai in Thiruvananthapuram, Kerala. Her family then moved to her native place in Kollam, where she had a luxurious childhood, living in a bungalow  by the backwaters of Kollam. After her boarding in Ooty, at the age of 7, she joined Mount Carmel Convent Anglo-Indian Girls High School in Kollam. She was married to Surenda Nath on 1980 at the age of 17 and moved to Calcutta to have a settled married life but things did not turn out the way she had desired and had to be satisfied  with taking forward her life in a tiny one bed room apartment. They have one daughter, Kavitha. Later she married Rakesh (aka Rocky) in 1993 but due to his heavy drinking & gambling she left him. Her three sisters, Gopika, Renuka and Devika were trained by her and are also into hair and skin makeover. She lives in New Delhi but frequently travels to Trivandrum and Kochi.

Career
She started her career as a  hair stylist and moved on to Make-up. When Ambika started her first salon it was called Visions by Ambika. She later decided to develop it as a brand.  At present Ambika Pillai is a brand by itself. Pillai's salon has branches in South Extension, Punjabi Bagh, Rajouri Garden, Malviya Nagar and Model Town in the Delhi National Capital Territory; Gurgaon in Haryana; Chhatarpur in Madhya Pradesh; and Kochi and Trivandrum in Kerala.

Awards

Television
Pillai has appeared as a judge in:
 Midukki (Mazhavil Manorama)
 Malayali Veetamma (Flowers)

References

External links
 

Hairdressers
Living people
Artists from Kollam
Indian make-up artists
Articles created or expanded during Women's History Month (India) - 2015
Year of birth missing (living people)